GES is a rural locality (a settlement) in Kubenskoye Rural Settlement, Vologodsky District, Vologda Oblast, Russia. The population was 17 as of 2002.

Geography 
GES is located 44 km northwest of Vologda (the district's administrative centre) by road. Maslozavod is the nearest rural locality.

References 

Rural localities in Vologodsky District